Tector may refer to:


Fiction
Tector Gorch, a character in the 1969 film The Wild Bunch
Tector Crites, a character in the 1972 film The Life and Times of Judge Roy Bean
Tector Pike, a character in the 1989 film Blind Fury
Tector Gorch, a minor Buffy the Vampire Slayer villain
Tector, a character in the 2003 film Small Town Conspiracy
Tector Murphy, a supporting character in the 2011 TV series Falling Skies

People
Chris Tector, a person associated with Turn 10 Studios
Jack Tector, an Irish cricketer with the Ireland national under-19 cricket team
J.L. Tector, a hurler; see Wexford Senior Hurling Championship
Jos Tector, a player of American football with the Cornish Sharks
Konrad Lundqvist Petterson Tector (1838–1876), a Swedish criminal, one of the last public executions in Sweden
William R. Tector, a former principal of Sandford Park School

Other uses
Iveco Tector, an engine manufactured by Iveco
Tector-class, a variant form of Star Destroyer

See also
Hector (disambiguation)